Stadio Città di Arezzo (formerly Stadio Comunale) is a multi-purpose stadium, located in Arezzo, Tuscany, Italy.  It is used mostly for football matches and is the home of the U.S. Arezzo football club. It has a grass playing surface and a 13,128-seating capacity.

See also

1923 in architecture
List of football stadiums in Italy

S.S. Arezzo
Buildings and structures completed in 1923
Buildings and structures in Arezzo
Event venues established in 1923
Citta di Arezzo
Sports venues in Tuscany